Virginia is the name of several ships:

  or Virginia of Sagadahoc, a pinnace built in 1607-08 by colonists at the Popham Colony
 , a wooden replica schooner launched in 2005
 , a 32-gun frigate 
 , many ships by the name
 , many ships of the US Revenue Cutter Service
  was the first Confederate States Navy ironclad, built using the hull of the captured USS Merrimack
 , an ironclad ram.
 , a passenger steamship launched as SS Virginia, renamed in 1938

See also
 Virginia (disambiguation)
 
 

Ship names